Alioune Mbaye Nder (born April 28th 1969, Dakar, Senegal) is a Senegalese singer. Nder takes his name from the n'der, the drum favoured by his griot father.

Background
A dancer and percussionist in his youth, Nder began his singing career in 1991 with the group Lemzo Diamono, a break-off group from the hugely popular Super Diamono. Lemzo Diamono also included well-known Senegalese guitarist Lamine Faye. In 1993, Nder became Lemzo Diamono's lead vocalist and the band earned a large following over the next few years. In 1995, Nder left Lemzo Diamano to form his own band, the Setsima Group.

Nder, whose music until very recently was mostly available only on cassette, is regarded in Senegal as a modern-day griot and a super star of the new (Boul Falé) generation after Youssou N'Dour and Baaba Maal. He is known in Senegal as The Prince of Mbalax, and by some fans, The King of Mbalax.

Mbalax is a genre of African popular music developed in Senegal and Gambia. Evolving from the traditional rhythms of the Wolof people, and absorbing a Cuban influence, and later western pop, funk, and reggae influences. It incorporates traditional percussion instruments and singing (in Wolof, French, and sometimes English), with modern electric instruments such as electric guitar, electric bass, synthesizer, drum set, and also typically brass section. It was made popular by Senegalese pop star Youssou N'Dour.

Two of Nder's heroes are Bob Marley and Michael Jackson.

Le Setsima Group

Nder created le Setsima Group from young players who he could mold and grow alongside, and it has remained a tight formation with just a few personnel changes since then. Dakar's Le Temoin wrote, "The arrangements essentially done by the young musicians of le Setsima Group can easily compete with those traditionally realized by 'studio sharks.' What great art!"

Band members

Alioune Mbaye Nder - lead vocal
Aïcha Koné, Mbene Seck - backing vocals
Talla Seck, Lamine Touré - percussion
Malick Diaw - Lead guitar
Saliou Ba - Bass guitar
Ibou Tall, Elou Fall - keyboards
Bassirou Mbaye - drums
Mor Sarr - saxophone
Ibou Konaté - trumpet

Discography

Nder & le Setsima Group
Confiance(2007) – Afrique Productions Musiques (APM)
Courage (2005) – KSF Productions
Muchano	(2003) – KSF Productions
Lu Tax? (2002)
Takussaan à Dakar (Live), (2002) – Africa Fête AFD006
Live anniversaire vol. 2 (Live), (2001)
Live anniversaire vol. 1 (Live), (2001)
Super Thiof (2000)
Pansement (2000) – Africa Fête AFD003/Setsima
Nder & le Setsima Group (1999) – World Connection WC 43010
Aladji (1998)
Lënëën (1997)
Aduna (1995)

With Lemzo Diamono

Marimbalax (Compilation), (1996) – Stern's
–
(Note) The majority of Nder's music is still only available on local cassette, and only within Senegal. CD versions of Pansement and Nder & le Setsima Group are more widely available in Europe however.

External links
Video Clip of Nder & le Setsima Group
Video Clip of Nder performing with Youssou N'dour
Interview with Nder
Afropop Artist Nder
Africa Fête – (Record Label and Booking Agent of Nder) (fr)
Africa Fest – Alioune Mbaye Nder
Musique Senglaise – Nder & Le Setsima Group (fr)
Frank Bessem's Musiques D'Afrique – Nder

20th-century Senegalese male singers
1969 births
Living people
People from Dakar
21st-century Senegalese male singers